Miche (pronounced MEE-chee) is the name of a fashion handbag previously a Party Plan company, based in South Jordan, Utah, United States. In 2021 the patents and trademarks were purchased and Miche LLC reopened as just a direct wholesaler, based in Elizabeth, Colorado. Miche, LLC specializes in hand and shoulder bags based on a system of magnetic interchangeable bag covers (or Shells) and accompanying accessories. Products were originally available through independent sales representatives across America who marketed products via Miche Parties and personal websites, but are now online only through their website michelives.com. Prior to becoming just a direct wholesaler, distributors in many foreign countries also sold Miche and purchased products wholesale through the company.

Origins
The company was founded in 2005 by Michelle Romero and Annette Cavaness. In 2004, Romero thought of an idea to change the outside of a handbag, without physically changing the bag itself. She created a prototype by taking apart her own bag and revamping it using super glue and scrap fabric.

The name of the company came from Michelle's nickname, Miche (pronounced MEE-chee), which her mother-in-law calls her.

Styles and designs
Miche Base Bags were available in four sizes and various colors. Base Bags featured different internal pocket layouts and removable handles. Shells could be purchased separately or with a Base Bag, and attached to the Base Bag using magnets. The exteriors of the Classic and Petite Base Bags incorporated a silk and polyester blend in their hard-sided construction, while the Demi and Prima sizes were made of softer materials. Shell materials varied depending on the style, but were generally made from faux leather,  canvas  or  cotton. The Miche line also included other specialty bags that were not interchangeable as well as coin purses and wallets. New Shells and accessories were released monthly.

On January 8, 2010, Miche introduced its Hope Initiative. The Hope Initiative benefited a variety of specific causes, in particular cancer research; a portion of the proceeds from the sale of each specially-designed Hope Shell and related accessories went directly to various charitable organizations.

Closing and reopening 
In late March 2016, Miche informed their direct sales representatives that the company would be closing. Their complete inventory liquidation event began on March 28, 2016, and ended on April 18.

Despite the closing of Miche USA in 2016, the Miche Bag, shells and accessories remained in production through their former international partners including Miche Canada and Miche Europe.

In April 2021, the patents and trademarks were purchased by 4 women,  who were previously Miche representatives. Miche LLC is now located in Elizabeth, Colorado. They chose to reopen Miche due to its popularity and their love of fashionable, simplistic and interchangeable handbags. They operate as a wholesaler, available online at michelives.com. Miche started to release new shells to the US in October 2021.

References

External links

Miche Canada
Miche Europe

Companies based in Utah
American companies established in 2005
Manufacturing companies established in 2005
2010s fashion
Fashion accessory brands
Bags (fashion)
2005 establishments in Utah